Ara (Latin for "the Altar") is a southern constellation between Scorpius, Telescopium, Triangulum Australe, and Norma. It was (as ) one of the Greek bulk (namely 48) described by the 2nd-century astronomer Ptolemy, and it remains one of the 88 modern constellations designated by the International Astronomical Union.

The orange supergiant Beta Arae, to us its brightest star measured with near-constant apparent magnitude of 2.85, is marginally brighter than blue-white Alpha Arae. Seven star systems are known to host planets. Sunlike Mu Arae hosts four known planets. Gliese 676 is a (gravity-paired) binary red dwarf system with four known planets.

The Milky Way crosses the northwestern part of Ara. Within the constellation is Westerlund 1, a super star cluster that contains the red supergiant Westerlund 1-26, one of the largest stars known.

History 

In ancient Greek mythology, Ara was identified as the altar where the gods first made offerings and formed an alliance before defeating the Titans. One of the southernmost constellations depicted by Ptolemy, it had been recorded by Aratus in 270 BC as lying close to the horizon, and the Almagest portrays stars as far south as Gamma Arae. Professor Bradley Schaefer proposes such Ancients must have been able to see as far south as Zeta Arae, for a pattern that looked like an altar.

In illustrations, Ara is usually depicted as compact classical altar with its smoke 'rising' southward. However, depictions often vary. In the early days of printing, a 1482 woodcut of Gaius Julius Hyginus's classic Poeticon Astronomicon depicts the altar as surrounded by demons. Johann Bayer in 1603 depicted Ara as an altar with burning incense. Hyginus depicted the same though his featured devils on either side of the flames. Willem Blaeu, a Dutch uranographer of the 16th and 17th centuries, drew Ara as an altar for sacrifices, with a burning animal offering unusually whose smoke rises northward, represented by Alpha Arae.

The Castle of Knowledge by Robert Record of 1556 lists the constellation stating that "Under the Scorpions tayle, standeth the Altar."; a decade later a translation of a fairly recent mainly astrological work by Marcellus Palingenius of 1565, by Barnabe Googe states "Here mayst thou both the Altar, and the myghty Cup beholde."

Equivalents 
In Chinese astronomy, the stars of the constellation Ara lie within The Azure Dragon of the East (東方青龍, Dōng Fāng Qīng Lóng). Five stars of Ara formed Guī (龜), a tortoise, while another three formed Chǔ (杵), a pestle.

The Wardaman people of the Northern Territory in Australia saw the stars of Ara and the neighbouring constellation Pavo as flying foxes.

Characteristics
Covering 237.1 square degrees and hence 0.575% of the sky, Ara ranks 63rd of the 88 modern constellations by area. Its position in the Southern Celestial Hemisphere means that the whole constellation is visible to observers south of 22°N. Scorpius runs along the length of its northern border, while Norma and Triangulum Australe border it to the west, Apus to the south, and Pavo and Telescopium to the east respectively. The three-letter abbreviation for the constellation, as adopted by the International Astronomical Union, is "Ara". The official constellation boundaries, as set by Belgian astronomer Eugène Delporte in 1930, are defined by a polygon of twelve segments.

Features

Stars 

Bayer gave eight stars Bayer designations, labelling them Alpha through to Theta, though he had never seen the constellation directly as it never rises above the horizon in Germany. After charting the southern constellations, French astronomer Nicolas-Louis de Lacaille recharted the stars of Ara from Alpha though to Sigma, including three pairs of stars next to each other as Epsilon, Kappa and Nu.

Ara contains part of the Milky Way to the south of Scorpius and thus has rich star fields. Within the constellation's borders, there are 71 stars brighter than or equal to apparent magnitude 6.5.

Just shading Alpha Arae, Beta Arae is the brightest star in the constellation. It is an orange-hued star of spectral type K3Ib-IIa that has been classified as a supergiant or bright giant, that is around 650 light-years from Earth. It is around 8.21 times as massive and 5,636 times as luminous as the Sun. At apparent magnitude 2.85, this difference in brightness between the two is undetectable by the unaided eye. Close to Beta Arae is Gamma Arae, a blue-hued supergiant of spectral type B1Ib. Of apparent magnitude 3.3, it is 1110 ± 60  light-years from Earth. It has been estimated to be between 12.5 and 25 times as massive as the Sun, and have around 120,000 times its luminosity.

Alpha Arae is a blue-white main sequence star of magnitude 2.95, that is 270 ± 20 light-years from Earth. This star is around 9.6 times as massive as the Sun, and has an average of 4.5 times its radius. It is  5,800 times as luminous as the Sun, its energy emitted from its outer envelope at an effective temperature of 18,044 K. A Be star, Alpha Arae is surrounded by a dense equatorial disk of material in Keplerian (rather than uniform) rotation.  The star is losing mass by a polar stellar wind with a terminal velocity of approximately 1,000 km/s.

The third brightest star in Ara at magnitude 3.13 is Zeta Arae, an orange giant of spectral type K3III that is located 490 ± 10 light-years from Earth. Around 7–8 times as massive as the Sun, it has swollen to a diameter around 114 times that of the Sun and is 3800 times as luminous. Were it not dimmer by intervening interstellar dust, it would be significantly brighter at magnitude 2.11.

Delta Arae is a blue-white main sequence star of spectral type B8Vn and magnitude 3.6, 198 ± 4 light-years from Earth. It is around 3.56 times as massive as the Sun.

Epsilon1 Arae is an orange giant of apparent magnitude 4.1, 360 ± 10 light-years distant from Earth. It is around 74% more massive than the Sun. At an age of about 1.7 billion years, the outer envelope of the star has expanded to almost 34 times the Sun's radius.

Eta Arae is an orange giant of apparent magnitude 3.76, located 299 ± 5 light-years distant from Earth. Estimated to be around five billion years old, it has reached the giant star stage of its evolution. With 1.12 times the mass of the Sun, it has an outer envelope that has expanded to 40 times the Sun's radius. The star is now spinning so slowly that it takes more than eleven years to complete a single rotation.

GX 339-4 (V821 Arae) is a moderately strong variable galactic low-mass X-ray binary (LMXB) source and black-hole candidate that flares from time to time. From spectroscopic measurements, the mass of the black-hole was found to be at least of 5.8 solar masses.

Exoplanets have been discovered in seven star systems in the constellation.  Mu Arae (Cervantes) is a sunlike star that hosts four planets. HD 152079 is a sunlike star with a jupiter-like planet with an orbital period of 2097 ± 930 days. HD 154672 is an ageing sunlike star with a Hot Jupiter. HD 154857 is a sunlike star with one confirmed and one suspected planet. HD 156411 is a star hotter and larger than the sun with a gas giant planet in orbit. Gliese 674 is a nearby red dwarf star with a planet. Gliese 676 is a binary star system composed of two red dwarves with four planets.

Deep-sky objects 

The northwest corner of Ara is crossed by the galactic plane of the Milky Way and contains several open clusters (notably NGC 6200) and diffuse nebulae (including the bright cluster/nebula pair NGC 6188 and NGC 6193). The brightest of the globular clusters, sixth magnitude NGC 6397, lies at a distance of just , making it one of the closest globular clusters to the Solar System.

Ara also contains Westerlund 1, a super star cluster containing itself the possible red supergiant Westerlund 1-237 and the red supergiant Westerlund 1-26.

Although Ara lies close to the heart of the Milky Way, two spiral galaxies (NGC 6215 and NGC 6221) are visible near star Eta Arae.

Open clusters 
 NGC 6193 is an open cluster containing approximately 30 stars with an overall magnitude of 5.0 and a size of 0.25 square degrees, about half the size of the full Moon. It is approximately 4200 light-years from Earth. It has one bright member, a double star with a blue-white hued primary of magnitude 5.6 and a secondary of magnitude 6.9. NGC 6193 is surrounded by NGC 6188, a faint nebula only normally visible in long-exposure photographs.
 NGC 6200
 NGC 6204
 NGC 6208
 NGC 6250
 NGC 6253
 IC 4651

Globular clusters 
 NGC 6352
 NGC 6362
 NGC 6397 is a globular cluster with an overall magnitude of 6.0; it is visible to the naked eye under exceptionally dark skies and is normally visible in binoculars. It is a fairly close globular cluster, at a distance of 10,500 light-years.

Planetary Nebulae 
 The Stingray Nebula (Hen 3–1357), the youngest known planetary nebula as of 2010, formed in Ara; the light from its formation was first observable around 1987.
 NGC 6326.  A planetary nebula that might have a binary system at its center.

Notes

References

Bibliography 
 
 
 
 
 

Online sources

External links 

 The Deep Photographic Guide to the Constellations: Ara
 Warburg Institute Iconographic Database (medieval and early modern images of Ara)

 
Constellations
Southern constellations
Constellations listed by Ptolemy